Pain Deh (also Romanized as Pā’īn Deh) is a village in Miyan Velayat Rural District, in the Central District of Mashhad County, Razavi Khorasan Province, Iran. At the 2006 census, its population was 1,315, in 314 families.

References 

Populated places in Mashhad County